Lanesboro Township, population 6,015, is one of eight townships in Anson County, North Carolina. Lanesboro Township contains the towns of Peachland and Polkton within it.

Geography
Lanesboro Township is drained by Lanes Creek and its tributaries on the north and west side.  These tributaries include Canebreak Branch, Big Branch, Cedar Branch, Rocky Branch, Blackwell Branch, Lacey Branch, and Wide Mouth Branch.  The eastern and southern parts of the township are drained by Brown Creek and its tributaries including Little Brown Creek, Ledbetter Branch, Swans Branch, Lick Creek, and Kelley Branch.

References

Townships in Anson County, North Carolina
Townships in North Carolina